Two ships of the French Navy have borne the name Volta:
, a  launched in 1867 and stricken in 1892
 , a  launched in 1911 and stricken in 1922
 , a  launched in 1936 and scuttled in 1942

French Navy ship names